The Chamber of Representatives of Misiones Province is the unicameral legislative body of Misiones Province, in Argentina. It convenes in the provincial capital, Posadas.

It comprises 40 deputies, elected in a single multi-member district through proportional representation every four years. Elections employ the D'Hondt system. Deputies are elected for four-year terms every two years through staggered elections, and may run for re-election. There is, in addition, a 50% gender quota for party lists in elections.

Its powers and responsibilities are established in the provincial constitution. Unlike most other provincial legislatures in Argentina, the Misiones Chamber of Representatives is not presided by the province's vice governor, but rather counts with its own presiding officer elected from among its members (presently Carlos Rovira, of the FRC).

The Chamber of Representatives was established in 1953, when the National Territory of Misiones became a province of Argentina.

References

External links
 
Constitution of Misiones Province 

1953 establishments in Argentina
Politics of Argentina
Misiones Province
Misiones